Warangal Lok Sabha constituency is one of the 17 Lok Sabha (Lower House of the Parliament) constituencies in Telangana state in southern India. This constituency is reserved for the candidates belonging to the Scheduled castes

Pasunoori Dayakar of Telangana Rashtra Samithi is currently representing the constituency for the first time.

Overview
Since its inception in 1952 the seat was won by many political parties with Congress winning 8 times out of 16 whereas other outfits like Telangana Praja Samithi and the Telugu Desam Party have won it during different general elections.

Telangana Rashtra Samithi emerged victorious on three occasions including the 2015 Bye election where its candidate Pasunuri Dayakar registered the biggest victory margin compared to any leader in the history of the Telangana

Assembly segments

Warangal Lok Sabha constituency comprises the following Legislative Assembly segments:

Members of Parliament

Election results

General Election, 2019

General By-Election, 2015

General Election, 2014

General Election, 2009

General Election, 2004

General Election, 1999

General Election, 1998

General Election, 1996

General Election, 1991

Trivia
 Pasunuri Dayakar of Telangana Rashtra Samithi won with record margin of nearly 4.60 lakh votes in bypolls making it highest majority in the history of Telangana Lok Sabha elections.

See also
 Warangal district
 List of Constituencies of the Lok Sabha

References

External links
 Warangal lok sabha  constituency election 2019 date and schedule

Lok Sabha constituencies in Telangana
Hanamkonda district